Shaba is a town in Kenya, situated 260 km to the southeast of Marsabit and 80 km to the north of the Equator. There is a nearby Shaba National Reserve, located east of the Samburu National Reserve.

References 

Populated places in Rift Valley Province
Samburu County